The Salisbury Bypass is a controlled-access highway and bypass around the business district of Salisbury and Fruitland, Maryland. It consists of segments of:
 U.S. Route 50 in Maryland along its northern half;
 U.S. Route 13 in Maryland along its eastern half; and 
 US 13 and US 50 concurrently along the northeast section.

Freeways in the United States
Transportation in Wicomico County, Maryland
U.S. Route 13
U.S. Route 50